Russell Madden may refer to:
 Russell Madden (Australian rules footballer)
 Russell Madden (rugby league)